The jarana is the typical dance and musical form of the Yucatan Peninsula. There are two possible meters: "seis por ocho" (in musical counts of 6/8) and "tres por cuatro" (in musical counts of 3/4). The jarana dance is done in pairs; the footwork is the same for women and men.

The music of the jarana is performed by a wind band ensemble.

Gallery

External links 
YouTube video - Jarana music

References 
 

Regional styles of Mexican music
Mexican musical ensembles
Dance in Mexico
Yucatán
Yucatán Peninsula